Cameron Hughes (born October 9, 1996) is a Canadian professional ice hockey player currently playing for the Coachella Valley Firebirds of the American Hockey League (AHL) as a prospect for the Seattle Kraken of the National Hockey League (NHL).

Personal life
Hughes was born on October 9, 1996, in Edmonton Alberta, to parents Brian and Pauline. Hughes is the oldest of three brothers; Ryan, Liam, and Ethan, who all play ice hockey. Growing up in Edmonton, Hughes played with the Canadian Athletic Club Midget Hockey program of the Alberta Midget Hockey League (AMHL) and the Spruce Grove Saints of the Alberta Junior Hockey League. During his time in the AMHL, Hughes was drafted by the Swift Current Broncos of the Western Hockey League (WHL). Instead of joining the Broncos, he played with the Saints and tallied 31 points in 60 regular season games and 9 points in 14 playoff games as he helped the Saints to the AJHL finals. In 2014, Hughes was named to the Reebok North Division All-League Team. Later that year, he committed to play collegiate ice hockey for the Wisconsin Badgers men's ice hockey team.

Playing career
Hughes played for the Wisconsin Badgers at the University of Wisconsin from 2014 to 2018. There, he majored in agricultural and applied economics/agricultural business management. The Badgers had a disappointing 2014–15 season and began the year with the second-worst record amongst the 59 schools competing in NCAA Division I. As a result, during the winter break, Hughes debated joining the Broncos in the WHL instead of returning to college. However, he returned to the University of Wisconsin and finished the season with three goals and 10 assists for 13 points through 34 games. Following his freshman season, Hughes was ranked 196th overall amongst North American skaters by the NHL Central Scouting Bureau. He was eventually drafted 165th overall by the Boston Bruins in the 2015 NHL Entry Draft. After attending their development camp, Hughes returned to Wisconsin for his sophomore season.

During the offseason following his sophomore season, Hughes participated in the Bruins' 2016 Development Camp. Upon returning to the Badgers, Hughes tallied a 12-game point streak which tied the programs longest streak record. At the conclusion of his junior season, Hughes had tallied a team-high seven goals and 25 assists, earning him the teams' Fenton Kelsey, Jr.-Mike Richter Most Competitive Award. He was also appointed team captain for the 2017–18 season.

Prior to returning for his senior season, Hughes underwent shoulder surgery during the offseason and spent the first three weeks participating in limited team practices. On March 10, 2018, Hughes concluded his collegiate career by signing an entry-level contract with the Boston Bruins.

Professional
Hughes made his NHL debut with the on November 4, 2019, during a game against the Pittsburgh Penguins as a replacement for fourth-liner David Backes.

On July 7, 2021, Hughes signed a one-year, two-way contract extension to remain with the Bruins organization.

As a free agent from the Bruins after parts of five seasons, Hughes signed a two-year, two-way contract with the Seattle Kraken on July 13, 2022.

Career statistics

Awards and honours

References

External links

1996 births
Living people
Boston Bruins draft picks
Boston Bruins players
Canadian ice hockey centres
Coachella Valley Firebirds players
Providence Bruins players
Ice hockey people from Edmonton
Spruce Grove Saints players
Wisconsin Badgers men's ice hockey players